Ed Pinkham may refer to:

 Ed Pinkham (baseball) (1846–1906), Major League Baseball infielder
 Ed Pinkham (American football) (born 1953), American college football coach